Harlequin-type ichthyosis is a genetic disorder that results in thickened skin over nearly the entire body at birth. The skin forms large, diamond/trapezoid/rectangle-shaped plates that are separated by deep cracks. These affect the shape of the eyelids, nose, mouth, and ears and limit movement of the arms and legs. Restricted movement of the chest can lead to breathing difficulties. These plates fall off over several weeks. Other complications can include premature birth, infection, problems with body temperature, and dehydration. The condition is the most severe form of ichthyosis, a group of genetic disorders characterised by scaly skin.

Harlequin-type ichthyosis is caused by mutations in the ABCA12 gene. This gene codes for a protein necessary for transporting lipids out of cells in the outermost layer of skin. The disorder is autosomal recessive and inherited from parents who are carriers. Diagnosis is often based on appearance at birth and confirmed by genetic testing. Before birth, amniocentesis or ultrasound may support the diagnosis.

There is no cure for the condition. Early in life, constant supportive care is typically required. Treatments may include moisturizing cream, antibiotics, etretinate or retinoids. Around half of those affected die within the first few months; however, retinoid treatment can increase chances of survival. Children who survive the first year of life often have long-term problems such as red skin, joint contractures and delayed growth. The condition affects around 1 in 300,000 births. It was first documented in a diary entry by Reverend Oliver Hart in America in 1750.

Signs and symptoms
Newborns with harlequin-type ichthyosis present with thick, fissured armor-plate hyperkeratosis. Sufferers feature severe cranial and facial deformities. The ears may be very poorly developed or absent entirely, as may the nose. The eyelids may be everted (ectropion), which leaves the eyes and the area around them very susceptible to infection. Babies with this condition often bleed during birth. The lips are pulled back by the dry skin (eclabium).

Joints are sometimes lacking in movement, and may be below the normal size. Hypoplasia is sometimes found in the fingers. Polydactyly has also been found on occasion. In addition, the fish mouth appearance, mouth breathing, and xerostomia place affected individuals at extremely high risk for developing rampant dental decay.

Patients with this condition are extremely sensitive to changes in temperature due to their hard, cracked skin, which prevents normal heat loss. The skin also restricts respiration, which impedes the chest wall from expanding and drawing in enough air. This can lead to hypoventilation and respiratory failure. Patients are often dehydrated, as their plated skin is not well suited to retaining water.

Cause 

Harlequin-type ichthyosis is caused by a loss-of-function mutation in the ABCA12 gene. This gene is important in the regulation of protein synthesis for the development of the skin layer. Mutations in the gene cause impaired transport of lipids in the skin layer and may also lead to shrunken versions of the proteins responsible for skin development. Less severe mutations result in a collodion membrane and congenital ichthyosiform erythroderma-like presentation.

ABCA12 is an ATP-binding cassette transporter (ABC transporter), which are members of a large family of proteins that hydrolyze ATP to transport cargo across cell membranes. ABCA12 is thought to be a lipid transporter in keratinocytes necessary for lipid transport into lamellar granules during the formation of the lipid barrier in the skin.

Diagnosis 
The diagnosis of harlequin-type ichthyosis relies on both physical examination and laboratory tests. Physical assessment at birth is vital for the initial diagnosis of harlequin ichthyosis. Physical examination reveals characteristic symptoms of the condition especially the abnormalities in the skin surface of newborns. Abnormal findings in physical assessments usually result in employing other diagnostic tests to ascertain the diagnosis.

Genetic testing is the most specific diagnostic test for harlequin ichthyosis. This test reveals a loss of function mutation on the ABCA12 gene. Biopsy of skin may be done to assess the histologic characteristics of the cells. Histological findings usually reveal hyperkeratotic skin cells, which leads to a thick, white and hard skin layer.

Treatment
Constant care is required to moisturize and protect the skin. The hard outer layer eventually peels off, leaving the vulnerable inner layers of the dermis exposed. Early complications result from infection due to fissuring of the hyperkeratotic plates and respiratory distress due to physical restriction of chest wall expansion.

Management includes supportive care and treatment of hyperkeratosis and skin barrier dysfunction. A humidified incubator is generally used. Intubation is often required until nares are present. Nutritional support with tube feeds is essential until eclabium resolves and infants can begin nursing. Ophthalmology consultation is useful for the early management of ectropion, which is initially pronounced and resolves as scales are shed. Liberal application of petrolatum is needed multiple times a day. In addition, careful debridement of constrictive bands of hyperkeratosis should be performed to avoid digital ischemia.

Cases of digital autoamputation or necrosis have been reported due to cutaneous constriction bands. Relaxation incisions have been used to prevent this morbid complication.

Prognosis 
In the past, the disorder was nearly always fatal, whether due to dehydration, infection (sepsis), restricted breathing due to the plating, or other related causes. The most common cause of death was systemic infection, and sufferers rarely survived for more than a few days. However, improved neonatal intensive care and early treatment with oral retinoids, such as the drug Isotretinoin, may improve survival. Early oral retinoid therapy has been shown to soften scales and encourage desquamation. After as little as two weeks of daily oral isotretinoin, fissures in the skin can heal, and plate-like scales can nearly resolve. Improvement in the eclabium and ectropion can also be seen in a matter of weeks.

Children who survive the neonatal period usually evolve to a less severe phenotype, resembling a severe congenital ichthyosiform erythroderma. Patients continue to suffer from temperature dysregulation and may have heat and cold intolerance. Patients can also have generalized poor hair growth, scarring alopecia, contractures of digits, arthralgias, failure to thrive, hypothyroidism, and short stature. Some patients develop a rheumatoid factor-positive polyarthritis. Survivors can also develop fish-like scales and retention of a waxy, yellowish material in seborrheic areas, with ear adhered to the scalp.

The oldest known survivor is Nusrit "Nelly" Shaheen, who was born in 1984 and is in relatively good health as of June 2021. The maximum lifespan of patients with this disease has not yet been determined with the new treatments.

A study published in 2011 in the Archives of Dermatology concluded: "Harlequin ichthyosis should be regarded as a severe chronic disease that is not invariably fatal. With improved neonatal care and probably the early introduction of oral retinoids, the number of survivors is increasing."

Epidemiology 
The condition occurs in roughly 1 in 300,000 people. As an autosomal recessive condition, rates are higher among certain ethnic populations with a higher likelihood of consanguinity.

History
The disease has been known since 1750, and was first described in the diary of Rev. Oliver Hart from Charleston, South Carolina:

"On Thursday, April the 5th, 1750, I went to see a most deplorable object of a child, born the night before of one Mary Evans in 'Chas'town. It was surprising to all who beheld it, and I scarcely know how to describe it. The skin was dry and hard and seemed to be cracked in many places, somewhat resembling the scales of a fish. The mouth was large and round and open. It had no external nose, but two holes where the nose should have been. The eyes appeared to be lumps of coagulated blood, turned out, about the bigness of a plum, ghastly to behold. It had no external ears, but holes where the ears should be. The hands and feet appeared to be swollen, were cramped up and felt quite hard. The back part of the head was much open. It made a strange kind of noise, very low, which I cannot describe. It lived about forty-eight hours and was alive when I saw it."

The harlequin-type designation comes from the diamond shape of the scales at birth (resembling the costume of Arlecchino).

Gallery

Notable cases

 Devan Mahadeo ( June 11 , 1985 year — January 23 , 2023 year, 37 year of life.Born in Trinidad and Tobago):had been involved in Special Olympics for over 17 years and excelled at both the Winter Games and Summer Games . He earned silver medals in football at Dublin, Ireland in 2003 and Shanghai, China 2007, bronze in floor hockey at 2013 Winter Games in Pyongyang , Korea and gold at the 2015 Special Olympics World Games in Los Angeles, California https://newsday.co.tt/2023/01/23/special-olympics-tt-mourns-death-of-top-ex-athlete/ .
 Andrea Aberle (1969 - 2021) was 51 years old, making her one of the oldest individuals with harlequin ichthyosis- as well as in general throughout the world, and in the US in particular. She lived in California with her husband before she died from skin-related complications. 
At the moment (March 2023) is the person who has lived the most years with the same disease (among known cases)-this is among all known cases, but she has already died (although she was born before everyone else and died later than some).
https://www.firstskinfoundation.org/andrea-a-2020 .
 Nusrit "Nelly" Shaheen (born in 1984) she resides in Coventry, England, and was one of nine children in a Pakistani Muslim household. Four of her eight siblings also had the condition but died as young children.
She currently (also March 2023) has the largest number of years of life among people with the same disease, and at the same time, only among those who are still alive (also among the currently known such cases here)
 Ryan Gonzalez (born in 1986) Currently the second oldest person with the condition living in the USA. He was featured in an episode of Medical Incredible.
 Stephanie Turner (1993 – 2017) third oldest in the US with the same condition, and the first ever to give birth. Turner's two children do not have the disease. She died on March 3, 2017, at age 23.
 Mason van Dyk (born 2013), despite being given a life expectancy of one to five days, was five years old as of July 2018. Doctors told his mother Lisa van Dyke that he was the first case of harlequin ichthyosis in South Africa, and that she has a one-in-four chance to have another child with the disease.
 Hunter Steinitz (born October 17, 1994) is one of only twelve Americans living with the disease and is profiled on the National Geographic "Extraordinary Humans: Skin" special.
 Mui Thomas (born in 1992 in Hong Kong) qualified as first rugby referee with harlequin ichthyosis.
 A female baby born in Nagpur, India in June 2016 died after two days. She was the first case reported in India.
 Hannah Betts: Born 1990 in Great Britain; died in 2022 at 32 years old.
 Ng Poh Peng (she was born in 1991 in Singapore ):
She grabbed the attention of the nation when she was born, due to her marked difference in appearance. Doctors had not expected her to live past her teenage years, but here's Ng Poh Peng, alive and well at 32 years old.
https://www.asiaone.com/health/woman-born-rare-skin-disease-my-parents-love-me-thats-enough .

References

External links

 Information from the U.S. National Institutes of Health

Genodermatoses
Autosomal recessive disorders
Rare diseases
Wikipedia medicine articles ready to translate